The 2015 ICC Awards were awards presented in ten categories by the ICC to international cricket players.

The awards covered and took into account players' performance between 18 September 2014 and 13 September 2015.

Award categories and winners

Individual awards

Men's awards

Women's awards

Other awards

ICC Teams of the Year

ICC Men's Test Team of the Year

Alastair Cook was selected as the captain of the Test Team of the Year, with Sarfaraz Ahmed selected as the wicket-keeper. Other players are:

 David Warner
 Alastair Cook
 Kane Williamson
 Younis Khan
 Steve Smith
 Joe Root
 Sarfaraz Ahmed
 Stuart Broad
 Trent Boult
 Yasir Shah
 Josh Hazlewood
 Ravichandran Ashwin (12th man)

ICC Men's ODI Team of the Year

AB de Villiers was selected as the captain of the ODI Team of the Year, with Kumar Sangakkara selected as the wicket-keeper. Other players are:

 Tillakaratne Dilshan
 Hashim Amla
 Kumar Sangakkara
 AB de Villiers
 Steve Smith
 Ross Taylor
 Trent Boult
 Mohammed Shami
 Mitchell Starc
 Mustafizur Rahman
 Imran Tahir
 Joe Root (12th man)

Selection Committee
Both of the ICC World XI Teams were chosen by a specially appointed selection panel, known as the ICC Selection Committee and chaired by ICC Cricket Hall of Famer Anil Kumble.

Selection Committee members:

 Anil Kumble (chairman)
 Ian Bishop
 Mark Butcher
 Belinda Clark
 Gundappa Viswanath

See also

 International Cricket Council
 ICC Awards
 Sir Garfield Sobers Trophy (Cricketer of the Year)
 ICC Test Player of the Year
 ICC ODI Player of the Year
 David Shepherd Trophy (Umpire of the Year)
 ICC Women's Cricketer of the Year
 ICC Test Team of the Year
 ICC ODI Team of the Year

References

International Cricket Council awards and rankings
2015 sports awards
ICC Awards